Stadlen is a surname. Notable people with the surname include:

 Hedi Stadlen, Austrian Jewish philosopher, political activist, and musicologist, better known in Sri Lanka as Hedi Keuneman
 Lewis J. Stadlen, American stage and screen character actor
 Matthew Stadlen, English television presenter and producer for the BBC, son of Nicholas
Nicholas Stadlen, British former judge, son of Hedi and Peter
 Peter Stadlen, Austrian composer, pianist, and musicologist